"Before I Decay" is a single by Japanese rock band, The Gazette. It was released on 7 October 2009. The single reached #2 on the Oricon Weekly Charts, selling 28,546 copies in its first week.

Track listing
 "Before I Decay" – 3:44
 "Mayakashi" (瞞し; Deception) – 4:05
All music by the Gazette. All lyrics by Ruki.

Disk 2
"Before I Decay" (Music video) (Optical Impression Only)

References

2009 singles
The Gazette (band) songs
2009 songs
King Records (Japan) singles